Events in the year 1897 in Brazil.

Incumbents

Federal government
President: Prudente de Morais
Vice-President: Manuel Vitorino

Governors 
 Alagoas: Jose Vieira Peixoto (until June 12), Manuel Jose Duarte (starting June 12)
 Amazonas: Fileto Pires Ferreira
 Bahia: Luís Viana
 Ceará: Antônio Nogueira Accioli
 Goiás: Francisco Leopoldo Rodrigues Jardim
 Maranhão:
 until March 26: Casimiro Vieira Jr
 from March 26: Alfredo Martins
 Mato Grosso: Manuel José Murtinho
 Minas Gerais: Bias Fortes
 Pará:
 until February 1: Lauro Sodré
 from February 1: Pais de Carvalho
 Paraíba: Antônio Alfredo Mello
 Paraná: Santos Andrade
 Pernambuco: Joaquim Correia de Araújo
 Piauí: Raimundo Artur de Vasconcelos
 Rio Grande do Norte: Joaquim Ferreira Chaves
 Rio Grande do Sul: Júlio Prates de Castilhos
 Santa Catarina:
 São Paulo: 
 Sergipe:

Vice governors 
 Rio de Janeiro: 
 Rio Grande do Norte:
 São Paulo:

Events
6 January –  An expeditionary force, consisting of 557 soldiers and officers under the command of Major Febrônio de Brito, who attacks the well-defended village of Canudos.  The troops are eventually forced to retreat when confronted with more than 4,000 insurrectionists.
7 August – Euclides da Cunha goes to the Sertão ("backland"), as war correspondent for O Estado de S. Paulo.
2 October – the War of Canudos comes to a brutal end, when a large Brazilian army force overruns the village and kills nearly all the inhabitants.

Births
6 February – Alberto Cavalcanti, film director and producer (died 1982)
30 April – Humberto Mauro, film director (died 1983)
7 June – Lampião, bandit (died 1938)
20 September – Humberto de Alencar Castelo Branco, politician (died 1967)
4 November – Oscar Lorenzo Fernández, composer (died 1948)

Deaths
1 January – Adolfo Caminha, Naturalist novelist (born 1867; tuberculosis)
4 March – Antônio Moreira César, army colonel, killed in action
22 September – Antônio Conselheiro, religious leader, preacher, and founder of the village of Canudos (born 1830; dysentery)
13 November – Francisco de Paula Ney, poet and journalist (born 1858)

References

 
1890s in Brazil
Years of the 19th century in Brazil
Brazil
Brazil